Whitner is a neighborhood of Louisville, Kentucky located along Bishop Lane and Pinewood Road.

References

Neighborhoods in Louisville, Kentucky